Silo 15 is a 1971 Australian television movie.  It was shot in 1969 and was produced by Grahame Jennings and directed by John Alaimo. It runs for 49 minutes.

Plot
In the 1990s, two men are trapped in a nuclear missile silo with war looming.

Cast
Jack Thompson
Owen Weingott

Production
The film was based on an original TV play by Mosman writer Gregory Marton which had first been conceived as a stage play. In 1965 he sent it to the ABC but did not hear back from them. He began negotiations with companies in Europe to make it and ask for it back. The play won a Merit Award at the first Australian Writers Guild Awards in March 1968 and sold to West Germany for $1,000. The Sydney Morning Herald wrote an article about this in 1968 prompting revived interest in the play.

The German version was shot in Hamburg and shown throughout Europe on German speaking networks. An Australian version was filmed in Sydney, produced by Grahame Jennings and directed by John Alaimo.  By August 1969 the Australian version had been sold to the US (the National Educational Television Network), Canada and the BBC 2 but it had not been shown on Australian TV. It was broadcast on BBC Two, 2 September 1969, 21:10pm. To give it at some audience, it was screened at the Gala Cinema in Sydney. Jennings said, "We feel that an important issue is at stake here, that a critical point has been reached in the production of drama by Australians for Australian television."

When the film aired in the cinema, the Sydney Morning Herald called it "tense, scary fare right out of the Twilight Zone and very much belongs to the small screen."

In 1972 the show aired on ATN Sydney.

The same producer and director later made Odyssey: A Journey, a documentary drama, which aired in 1972.

References

External links
1967 West German production at IMDb
1969 Australian production at IMDb
Odyssey: A Journey at IMDb
Silo 15 at National Film and Sound Archive

Australian television films
1971 films
1970s Australian films